Fur & Feather is a Canadian children's television series about animals which aired on CBC Television from 1955 to 1956. It was hosted by Ian McTaggart-Cowan who headed the Zoology Department at the University of British Columbia.

Scheduling
The Vancouver-produced series aired on Wednesdays at 5:00 p.m. from 6 July 1955 to 21 September 1955, then aired Mondays at 4:30 p.m. from 26 September 1955 until 25 June 1956.

The debut episode featured penguins. McTaggart-Cowan was joined by David Maxwell on some episodes.

Selected episodes

References

External links
 Fur & Feather at University of Victoria Libraries, selected episodes

CBC Television original programming
1955 Canadian television series debuts
1956 Canadian television series endings
1950s Canadian children's television series
Black-and-white Canadian television shows
Television shows filmed in Vancouver
Nature educational television series
Science education television series